Rafael Victoriano Barrios (born 23 May 1993) is an Argentine professional footballer who plays as a right-back for Quilmes.

Career
Barrios began his senior career in 2013 with Primera B Nacional team Independiente, making his debut in the Copa Argentina in a 1–0 defeat to Arsenal de Sarandí on 12 June. In August 2014, following Independiente's promotion, Barrios made his first Argentine Primera División appearance as a 58th-minute substitute in a 3–0 win versus Atlético de Rafaela. Just five more appearances followed throughout 2014, 2015 and 2016. In June 2016, Barrios joined Defensa y Justicia in a swap deal for Damián Martínez. He made his debut for Defensa on 7 November in a goalless draw against Aldosivi.

He completed a loan move to All Boys on 12 August 2018.

Career statistics
.

References

External links

1993 births
Living people
People from Corrientes
Argentine footballers
Association football defenders
Argentine Primera División players
Primera Nacional players
Primera B Metropolitana players
Club Atlético Independiente footballers
Defensa y Justicia footballers
All Boys footballers
San Martín de San Juan footballers
Nueva Chicago footballers
Quilmes Atlético Club footballers
Sportspeople from Corrientes Province